Cosmo Films (Now Cosmo First Limited) is an Indian multinational corporation that manufactures bi-axially oriented polypropylene films (BOPP) for packaging, label, lamination and industrial applications. The company is headquartered in New Delhi, India. Its manufacturing units are situated in India and South Korea. The company is listed on the Bombay Stock Exchange (BSE) and National Stock Exchange (NSE), India. Mr. Ashok Jaipuria founded Cosmo Films Limited in October 1976 and set up the first production plant at Aurangabad, Maharashtra in the year 1981. In 2001, Cosmo Films acquired a 76.51% stake in Gujarat Propack Limited. In 2009, Cosmo Films acquired US-based GBC Commercial Print Finishing for USD 17.1 million (about Rs. 82 crore).

Operations
Cosmo Films' major subsidiaries:
 Cosmo Films Korea Limited. Korea
 CF (Netherlands) Holdings Limited B.V. Netherlands 
 Cosmo Films SP. Z.O.O. Poland
 Cosmo Films Singapore Pte. Ltd. Singapore
 CF Investment Holding Private (Thailand) Company Limited. Thailand

Products
Packaging Films
BOPP Films
Label Films
Synthetic Paper
Barrier Films
Lamination Films
In Mould Label Films
Wrap Around Label Films
Sustainable Solutions

Structure

Management
 Pankaj Poddar, Group CEO
 Neeraj Jain, Chief Financial Officer (CFO)

Board of directors
As of December 2021, Cosmo Films' Board of directors consisted of the following directors;
 Mr. Ashok Jaipuria (Chairman & Managing Director)
 Mr. A.K. Jain (Director of Corporate Affairs)
 Mr. H.K. Aggarwal (Independent Director)

References
Pankaj Poddar elevated group CEO of Cosmo Films
Cosmo Films makes foray into pet care business with brand ZIGLY
Cosmo unveils fabric sanitiser Fabritizer

External links
 

Manufacturing companies of India